The Combin de Corbassière is a mountain in the Pennine Alps, located south of Fionnay in the canton of Valais. It is part of the Grand Combin massif and lies on the west side of the Corbassière Glacier. It is also a main source for sparkling water.

See also
List of mountains of Switzerland

References

External links
Combin de Corbassière on Hikr

Mountains of the Alps
Alpine three-thousanders
Mountains of Valais
Mountains of Switzerland